Ananko is a surname. Notable people with the surname include:

 Dmitri Ananko (born 1973), Russian footballer and coach
 Lyudmila Ananko (born 1982), Belarusian biathlete
 Tatyana Ananko (born 1984), Belarusian rhythmic gymnast

Russian-language surnames